Rock Heavies: Lucifer's Friend is the second of two compilation albums by Lucifer's Friend. This compilation collects some of Lucifer's Friend's best songs from their first album, Lucifer's Friend (1970), third album I'm Just a Rock & Roll Singer (1973), and fifth album Mind Exploding (1976). This compilation was released by Vertigo Records in 1980. This compilation is not as extensive as the Fontana Records release, The Devil's Touch (1976), in that it only includes three songs from Lucifer's Friend, one song from I'm Just a Rock & Roll Singer, and four songs from Mind Exploding.

Track listing
Ride the Sky - 2:55
In the Time of Job when Mammon Was a Yippie - 4:04
Free Hooker - 7:17
Fugitive - 4:55
Moonshine Rider - 4:47
Natural Born Mover - 4:24
Lucifer's Friend - 6:12
Born on the Run - 3:51

Personnel
 John Lawton – lead vocals
 Peter Hesslein – lead guitars, vocals
 Peter Hecht – keyboards
 Dieter Horns – bass, vocals
 Joachim Reitenbach – drums (tracks 1, 2, 7 and 8)
 Curt Cress – drums (tracks 3–6)
 Herbert Bornholdt – percussion, vocals (tracks 3–6 and 8)

1980 compilation albums
Lucifer's Friend albums